Walter Schuck (30 July 1920 – 27 March 2015) was a German military aviator who served in the Luftwaffe from 1937 until the end of World War II. As a fighter ace, he claimed 206 enemy aircraft shot down in over 500 combat missions, eight of which while flying the Messerschmitt Me 262 jet fighter.

List of aerial victories claimed
According to US historian David T. Zabecki, Schuck was credited with 206 aerial victories. Mathews and Foreman, authors of Luftwaffe Aces — Biographies and Victory Claims, researched the German Federal Archives and found records for 181 aerial victory claims, plus nine further unconfirmed claims. This figure of confirmed claims includes 171 aerial victories on the Eastern Front and 10 on the Western Front, including four four-engined bombers and 8 victories with the Me 262 jet fighter.

Victory claims were logged to a map-reference (PQ = Planquadrat), for example "PQ 36 Ost 3087". These sectors were then subdivided into 36 smaller units to give a location area 3 × 4 km in size.

Notes

References

Citations

Bibliography

 
 
 
 
 
 
 
 
 
 

Aerial victories of Schuck, Walter
Schuck, Walter
Aviation in World War II